Crécy-la-Chapelle is a commune in the Seine-et-Marne department in the Île-de-France region in north-central France.

Geography 

Crécy-la-Chapelle is crossed by the river Grand Morin. The ground of the area is limestone. Crécy-la-Chapelle station has rail connections to Chelles and Paris.

Localities within the commune are Crécy Bourg, Montbarbin, Serbonne, la Chapelle-sur-Crécy, Libernon, Mongrolle, Férolles, Montaudier, la Grand-Cour, les Hauts-Soleil, le Choisiel, le Souterain, Montpichet.

Demographics
The inhabitants are called Créçois.

Politics and administration 

The town is twinned with
Pielenhofen

Local culture and heritage

Spots and monuments 
 Collegiale Notre-Dame de Crécy-la-Chapelle, classified monument historique since 1846.
 Saint-Georges church.
 Beffroi.
 Quai des Tanneries.
 Tour aux Saints.
 War memorial for WW1 (Edme Marie Cadoux).
 The local museum is Musée de France, au sens de la loi 2002-5 du 4 January 2002 ; It is closed now (January 2013).

See also
Communes of the Seine-et-Marne department

References

External links

1999 Land Use, from IAURIF (Institute for Urban Planning and Development of the Paris-Île-de-France région) 
 
Official website of the city 

Communes of Seine-et-Marne